The All-China Youth Network Civilization Convention (全国青少年网络文明公约) is a short statement promulgated by the authorities in the People's Republic of China, regulating the use of the Internet in China by young users.

Contents
Its contents are:
 Do be good at learning from the Internet (要善于网上学习).
 Do not browse malignant information (不浏览不良信息).
 Do be honest and friendly in communication (要诚实友好交流).
 Do not insult or defraud others (不侮辱欺诈他人).
 Do improve awareness of self-protection (要增强自护意识).
 Do not physically meet with friends met on the Internet casually (不随意约会网友).
 Do maintain the security of the Internet (要维护网络安全).
 Do not jeopardize the order of the network (不破坏网络秩序).
 Do benefit the health of the body and mind (要有益身心健康).
 Do not indulge in virtual reality (不沉溺虚拟时空).

External links
 Report from Zhongguo Qingnian Bao

Internet in China
Youth in China